Cima di Cugn is a mountain of the Lepontine Alps on the Swiss-Italian border. The tripoint between the cantons of Graubünden, Ticino and the region of Lombardy (2,194 m) is located 100 m south-west of the summit.

References

External links
 Cima di Cugn on Hikr

Mountains of the Alps
Mountains of Switzerland
Mountains of Italy
Italy–Switzerland border
International mountains of Europe
Mountains of Graubünden
Graubünden–Ticino border
Lepontine Alps
Two-thousanders of Switzerland
Roveredo